Zodarion emarginatum is a spider species found in France, Corsica, Malta and Greece.

See also 
 List of Zodariidae species

References

External links 

emarginatum
Spiders of Europe
Fauna of Malta
Spiders described in 1873